Kevin Drum (born October 19, 1958) is an American journalist. Drum initially rose to prominence through the popularity of his independent blog Calpundit (2003–2004). He later was invited to launch a blog, Political Animal (2004–2008), for the Washington Monthly. In 2008, he took a writing and blogging position at Mother Jones magazine.
He was born in Long Beach, California and currently lives in Irvine, California.

Education
Drum graduated from Pacifica High School, in Garden Grove, California, then attended Caltech for two years before transferring to California State University, Long Beach, where he received his bachelor's degree in journalism in 1981. While at CSULB he served as city editor of the university's student run newspaper, The Daily 49er.

Career

Technology 
After graduating from college, Drum worked at RadioShack for several years, becoming a store manager in Costa Mesa, California, in 1983. He subsequently got a technical-writing job with a local technology company, becoming a product manager at Emulex. In 1992 he began working at Kofax Image Products, an Irvine, California-based supplier of application software and image processing products. In 2000 he was promoted from the position of VP for Marketing, becoming the general manager of the Ascent Software Business Unit within Kofax. In 2001 he moved to newly created position with Dicom New Ventures, the business development arm of the Dicom Group, Kofax's parent company. He quit in 2002 to become a marketing consultant; he gave that up in 2004 to concentrate full-time on writing.

Blogging 
Drum's blogging started in 2003, with his independent blog, Calpundit. The Washington Monthly, which wanted a blog, hired Drum in 2004 to launch Political Animal.

Drum defended Hillary Clinton during her email controversy, stating that her actions were "non-scandalous" and that she is "honest to a fault when discussing policy."

The Iraq war
Drum supported the 2003 Iraq War in its early stages, but just before the United States launched its attack, he changed his mind. He said, "Before the war started I switched to opposition on practical grounds (i.e., that George W. Bush's approach was incapable of accomplishing the goals it was meant to accomplish). Since then, I've pretty much come to the conclusion that, in fact, I should have opposed it all along on philosophical grounds: namely that it was a fundamentally flawed concept and had no chance of working even if it had been competently executed."

Lead and crime 
Drum published a series of blogs with evidence that suggests a link between crime and environmental lead, including the link between the decline in US crime rates and the phaseout of leaded gasoline. The theory was popularized by public health researcher Jessica Reyes and economist Rick Nevin; Drum's thesis was criticized by Jim Manzi in January 2013; Drum has continued to document new evidence in support of the theory.

Homelessness
In a 2017 blog post for Mother Jones discussing then-recently published research on public perceptions of the homeless, Drum stated:The researchers solved their conundrum by suggesting that most people are disgusted by the homeless. No kidding. About half the homeless suffer from a mental illness and a third abuse either alcohol or drugs. You’d be crazy not to have a reflexive disgust of a population like that.Stephen Piston, one of the authors of the research, objected, claiming that Drum’s article had “profoundly misinterpreted” their research, saying:We argue that media coverage of homeless people often portrays them as unclean or diseased, which activates disgust among the general public. But [Drum] cites our research as proof that homeless people are inherently disgusting — which perpetuates the very problem in journalism our research was trying to solve.

Personal

In an interview with Norman Geras, Drum said that his intellectual heroes were Franklin Delano Roosevelt, Isaac Newton, John Maynard Keynes, Edward R. Murrow and Charles Darwin.  He also considers Benjamin Franklin his all-time favorite political hero.

Drum married in 1993; he and his wife Marian have no children.

On October 24, 2014, Drum posted that he was undergoing treatment for multiple myeloma. On October 18, 2016, he updated readers that it had been two years since his diagnosis and he was "still alive and kicking." In August 2018 he reported that his multiple myeloma remained well under control.

References

External links
 Kevin Drum's blog at Mother Jones
 Kevin Drum interview at The Potomac Journal
 
 

1958 births
People with multiple myeloma
American bloggers
American columnists
California State University, Long Beach alumni
Living people
People from Irvine, California
Journalists from California
21st-century American non-fiction writers